The Division of Burke was an Australian Electoral Division in Victoria. The division was created in 1969 and abolished in 2004.

The division was named after Robert O'Hara Burke, an explorer who led the Victorian expedition in 1860, the first to cross Australia from south to north.

It was located in the outer northern suburbs of Melbourne, including Broadmeadows and Thomastown, but later extended into rural areas including Bacchus Marsh, Gisborne and Sunbury. It was generally a safe seat for the Australian Labor Party.

The last member for Burke, Brendan O'Connor, was elected for the new seat of Gorton in 2004.

Members

Election results

See also
 Division of Burke (1949–1955)

1969 establishments in Australia
Constituencies established in 1969
2004 disestablishments in Australia
Constituencies disestablished in 2004
Burke (1969-2004)